Hababah is a small town and 'uzlah in Thula District of 'Amran Governorate, Yemen. It is located between Thula and Shibam Kawkaban.

Name and history 
According to the 10th-century writer al-Hamdani, Hababah is named after Ḥabābah ibn Lubākhah, of the tribe of Himyar.

References 

Populated places in 'Amran Governorate